Scooped is a two CD compilation album including tracks from Pete Townshend's three albums Scoop, Another Scoop and Scoop 3. It was released in the US on the Redline label. A booklet is included that contains Townshend's commentary on the inspiration, ideas and instrumentation behind each song.

Track listing

Disc 1
Recorders - 1:19
Pinball Wizard - 2:56
Can You See the Real Me - 4:18
Dirty Water - 1:03
Zelda - 2:25
Pictures of Lily - 2:51
Body Language - 1:29
Siege: Theme 017 - 2:09
971104 Arpeggio Piano - 1:37
Brooklyn Kids - 4:48
Substitute - 3:33
Elephants - 2:53
Eminence Front - 6:35
Baroque Ippanese - 2:27
Magic Bus - 4:21
I Like It the Way It Is - 4:39
Unused Piano: 'Quadrophenia' - 2:35
Bargain - 4:15
Lonely Words - 3:57

Disc 2
So Sad About Us/Brrr - 4:47
Tough Boys - 3:13
You Better You Bet - 5:20
Mary - 3:26
Begin the Beguine - 4:13
Piano: 'Tipperary' - 1:03
How Can You Do It Alone - 6:26
Football Fugue - 3:28
Behind Blue Eyes - 3:30
Never Ask Me - 4:27
Circles (Instant Party) - 2:13
Holly Like Ivy - 2:55
Variations on Dirty Jobs - 4:47
Cat Snatch - 2:33
You're So Clever - 4:20
Love, Reign O'er Me - 4:56

References

2002 compilation albums
Pete Townshend compilation albums